Rubén Lobato may refer to:

 Rubén Lobato (cyclist) (born 1978), Spanish road cyclist
 Rubén Lobato (footballer) (born 1994), Spanish footballer